Ispat English Medium School is an English medium school in Sector 20 of the Rourkela Steel Township in Rourkela, Odisha, India. The school follows the syllabus prescribed by the CISCE.

History
Ispat English Medium School, the only Indian Certificate of Secondary Education institution under the Steel Authority of India (SAIL), Rourkela Steel Plant was founded in 1961 with 27 students, five teachers and two classrooms. It ran on the Indian Public School (IPS) system. The school has been affiliated with the Council for the Indian School Certificate Examinations, New Delhi since May 1964. It is one of the first schools established in Rourkela and the first to have English as the medium of instruction. Admission is only to children of parents working for SAIL, CISF, CRPF and other Central Government undertakings and REC.

About
In 1982 the institution started a Junior College (ISC +2) with a Science Stream. Its academic activities expanded with the new addition of a +2 Commerce stream from 2004.

In 2011, the school celebrated the 50th anniversary of its founding.

Facilities
The school is a co-educational day-school and is run by the education department of SAIL. The school currently has 1500 students and sixty teachers.

Housing 
The school is set up according to a house system. The four houses are:

References

External links
 Official website
 List of top 100 schools in India 
 Council for Indian School Certificate Examinations

Primary schools in India
High schools and secondary schools in Odisha
Schools in Rourkela
Educational institutions established in 1961
1961 establishments in Orissa